Stan Zweifel (born April 22, 1952) is an American football coach.  He is the head football coach at the University of Dubuque, a position he has held since 2009.  Zweifel served as the head football coach at Yankton College in Yankton, South Dakota from 1983 to 1984, and the University of Minnesota Morris from 1987 to 1990.  Between his tenures as Yankton and Minnesota–Morris, he was the offensive coordinator at the University of Northern Colorado.

Head coaching record

College

References

External links
 Dubuque profile
  Wisconsin Football Coaches Association profile

1952 births
Living people
Dubuque Spartans football coaches
Minnesota State Mavericks football coaches
Minnesota Morris Cougars football coaches
Northern Colorado Bears football coaches
Wisconsin–River Falls Falcons baseball players
Wisconsin–River Falls Falcons football players
Wisconsin–Whitewater Warhawks football coaches
Yankton Greyhounds football coaches
High school football coaches in Minnesota
High school football coaches in Wisconsin
People from Evansville, Wisconsin
People from New Glarus, Wisconsin
Players of American football from Wisconsin
Baseball players from Wisconsin